Unbound, formerly the Christian Foundation for Children and Aging, is a nonprofit sponsorship organization headquartered in Kansas City, Kansas. Unbound was founded by lay Catholic workers acting on the Gospel call to serve the poor. Its sponsorship program provides basic necessities such as food, education, clothing and access to medical care to children and elderly in some of the world's poorest communities. Unbound sponsors support more than 280,000 children, youth and aging persons in 19 countries.

History
The Christian Foundation for Children and Aging was founded on November 20, 1981, by siblings Bob Hentzen, Bud Hentzen, Jim Hentzen, Nadine Pearce and their friend Jerry Tolle. The siblings wanted to start a nonprofit to honor their late parents. Bob and Jerry were both missionaries who had witnessed firsthand the effects of poverty in developing countries, so they formed a sponsorship organization based on Catholic social teaching.

The first headquarters was in Hentzen's basement in Kansas City, Missouri.

More than 800,000 children, youth and aging persons and their families have been served through the sponsorship program. There are more than 280,000 sponsored children and aging persons. The committed partners with the organization have included groups with no Catholic affiliation.

On January 1, 2014, the name of the organization was changed. To explain the planned name change, Hentzen said in 2013, "We walk side-by-side with people who dream of freeing themselves from poverty, as they strive to achieve self-sufficiency and build strong communities. Our new name sums up our work." The current president and CEO, Scott Wasserman, said that rather than a bunch of initials, what "Bob wanted was a single word capturing the essence of Catholic social teaching and empowering the poor."

Hentzen died in October 2013 at the age of 77, and the National Catholic Reporter eulogized his work.

Programs

Sponsorship program

Unbound uses a sponsorship model of direct support. Its Hope for a Family sponsorship program aims to help families living in extreme poverty by connecting them with sponsors in the U.S. Sponsorship requires a $40 monthly commitment to help fund basic necessities and, in many instances, livelihood programs to help families become self-sustaining.

Sponsors have the opportunity to offer encouragement and support for their sponsored friends through the exchange of letters and photos. They also may choose to travel on Unbound awareness trips to meet their sponsored friends, learn about their lives and see how contributions are used.

Benefits and services provided through sponsorship are personalized according to the needs of the family and may include: food, school uniforms, school supplies, tuition or other school fees, clothing, housing repairs, medical and dental care, livelihood initiatives, literacy training for adults, Christmas and birthday celebrations and social outings and assistance for the elderly.

Scholarship program

The Unbound Scholarship Program provides educational scholarships to students pursuing secondary, post-secondary and vocational school. Scholarships are used for tuition, transportation, school supplies and books. Recipients are selected by projects based on economic need, commitment to completing their education, demonstrated leadership potential and interest in community service. Recipients perform service projects as a requirement of the program.

Scholarships are intended as supplemental assistance, and families contribute what they can toward the student's education.

Financials and ratings
More than 92% of Unbound's expenses go toward program support. In 2020, 3.4% of expenses were for administration and fundraising accounted for 4% of total expenses.

Charity Navigator gives Unbound a 4-star rating based on program expenses, administrative expenses, fundraising expenses and operating efficiency.

The American Institute of Philanthropy gives Unbound an A+ rating in its Charity Rating Guide. It is the only child sponsorship organization to hold this rating from the institute.

Unbound meets all 20 standards established by the Better Business Bureau Wise Giving Alliance.

Countries served
Unbound currently works with children and elders in 19 countries around the world.

References

External links
 Unbound
 Unbound Blog

Charities based in Kansas
Children's charities based in the United States
Catholic social teaching
Catholic charities
Development charities based in the United States
Christianity in Kansas
Non-profit organizations based in Kansas City, Kansas
International charities
Christian organizations established in the 20th century
Christian charities based in the United States